{{Speciesbox
| image = Heterocyathus aequicostatus, Aspidosiphon muelleri.jpeg
| image_caption = A. muelleri inside the coralHeterocyathus aequicostatus
| genus = Aspidosiphon
| species = muelleri
| authority = Diesing, 1851
| synonyms = 
  {{collapsible list |
    {{plainlist | style = margin-left: 1em; text-indent: -1em; |
Aspidosiphon armatum Danielssen & Koren, 1880
Aspidosiphon clavatus (de Blainville, 1827)
Aspidosiphon corallicola Sluiter, 1902
Aspidosiphon eremita Diesing, 1859
Aspidosiphon exhaustum Sluiter, 1912
Aspidosiphon heteropsammiae (Deshayes, 1863)
Aspidosiphon hispitrofus Li Greci, 1980
Aspidosiphon imbellis Sluiter, 1902
Aspidosiphon inquilinus Sluiter, 1902Aspidosiphon jukesii Baird, 1873Aspidosiphon michelini (Deshayes, 1863)Aspidosiphon mirabilis Théel, 1875Aspidosiphon pygmaeus Fischer, 1921Aspidosiphon scutatum (Müller, 1844)Aspidosiphon tortus Selenka & Bülow in Selenka, de Man & Bülow, 1883Cryptobia heteropsammiarum Deshayes, 1863Cryptobia michelini Deshayes, 1863Lesinia farcimen Schmidt, 1854Paraspidosiphon pygmaeus (Fischer, 1921)Phascolosoma cochlearium (Valenciennes, 1854)Phascolosoma radiata Alder, 1860Phascolosoma scutatum (Müller, 1844)Sipunculus scutatus Müller, 1844Sipunculus cochlearius Valenciennes, 1854Sipunculus clavatus de Blainville, 1827Sipunculus cochlearius Valenciennes, 1854Sipunculus heterocyathi McDonald, 1862
    }}
  }}
| synonyms_ref = 
}}Aspidosiphon muelleri is a species of unsegmented benthic marine worm in the phylum Sipuncula, the peanut worms.

DescriptionAspidosiphon muelleri has a cylindrical trunk and a narrower, cylindrical introvert at the front end which can retract back into the trunk. The oral disc is at the tip of the introvert; this has a terminal mouth and a cluster of ten to twelve short tentacles arranged in a crescent surrounding a nuchal organ. The introvert bears rings of tiny hooks at the front, and larger, more irregularly-placed hooks at the rear. At the front of the trunk is an anal shield and this acts as an operculum when the introvert is retracted. At the posterior of the trunk is the caudal shield; both it and the anal shield are rough and chitinised, with radial grooves and edged by wart-like papillae. The shields are dark in colour while the trunk is pale in small individuals, darkening to dark brown or blackish as they grow.

Distribution and habitatAspidosiphon muelleri occurs in the Mediterranean Sea and the eastern Atlantic Ocean, its range extending from the Shetland Islands to West Africa. It is also found in scattered locations in the Indo-Pacific. It often occupies empty gastropod or tusk shells, or resides in serpulid tubes, holes or crevices, or among the branches of coralline algae or the deepwater coral Lophelia pertusa. In Australia it is reported as being an obligate commensal inside solitary, free-living corals such as Heterocyathus aequicostatus and Heteropsammia cochlea.

Ecology
In the western Mediterranean Sea, the number of individuals build up over the summer months, with spawning taking place in August and September, when the sea temperature is nearing its maximum. After that, the number of individuals reduce again, likely because of the energy put into reproduction. When these worms occupy the tubes of polychaete worms, a small bivalve mollusc Epilepton clarkiae'' is often found living in association with them.

References

Sipunculans
Animals described in 1851